Kharkiv National University of Radio Electronics (NURE) is a technology university based in Kharkiv, Ukraine. Founded in 1930, it is among the oldest technologically-focused universities in Ukraine, with a student body of around 7,000.

NURE has 7 faculties and 34 departments, with a primary focus on electrical engineering, electronics, telecommunications, and computer technologies.

Foundation and history

NURE was founded in 1930 as the Kharkiv Engineering-Building Institute (KEBI), initially combining faculty from the Kharkiv Polytechnical Institute and architectural faculty of Kharkiv Art Institute. In 1934 the Kharkiv Geodetic Institute and Scientific Research Institute of Geodesy and Cartography entered the structure of the institute, which later became the largest higher education institution of Ukraine with 1734 students, 200 teachers and 4 faculties. In 2001 the university was advanced to a National University.

University structure
The University consists of 7 faculties and 34 departments:
 Faculty of Computer Sciences (CS)
 Faculty of Computer Engineering and Control (CEC)
 Faculty of Information and Analytical Technologies and Management (ITM)
 Faculty of Information Radio Technologies and Technical Information Security (IRTIS)
 Іnfocommunications (IC)
 Faculty of Automation and Computer Technologies (ACT)
 Faculty of Electronic and Biomedical Engineering (ELBE)

Awards and reputation
The University ranks first among technical universities of Ukraine, and Scimago IR ranked it as 13th place among the Ukraine institutions. In the 2023 QS World University Rankings,  NURE was ranked 1001-1200.

Scientific schools 
A number of research laboratories operate on the basis of NURE. Scientific research is conducted in both fundamental and scientific-applied areas. There are 30 scientific schools:
 telecommunication systems;
 medical instrument making and medical microprocessor systems;
 design and diagnostics of computer systems and networks;
 design and technical diagnostics of digital systems on crystals, computers and networks;
 meteor radar;
 methodologies, methods and information technologies for the development of integrated and Web-based information systems;
 systems analysis, decision making and mathematical modeling in socio-economic systems;
 intellectual information processing;
 radio wave and infrared diagnostics of materials, environments and objects;
 applied electrodynamics;
 bionics of intelligence;
 noosphere methodology and technology for solving knowledge management and competitive intelligence problems;
 remote methods of sounding the atmosphere by acoustic and electromagnetic waves;
 methods of normalization, recognition, analysis and image processing in computer vision systems;
 thermal methods of non-destructive quality control of materials and products: defectoscopy, defectometry and tomography;
 hybrid computing intelligence systems for data analysis, information processing and control.

Rectors 
 Vikutan Abram Danilovich (1931—1933)
 Krol Semyon Lvovich (1933—1937)
 Blinov Vladimir Vasilyevich (1937—1941)
 Lukin Hryhoriy Hryhorovych (1944—1952)
 Korzhik Mikhail Vasilyevich (1952—1956)
 Emelyanov Dmitry Sidorovich (1956—1963)
 Tereshchenko Alexey Ivanovich (1963—1965)
 Rvachov Vladimir Logvinovich (1965—1966)
 Novikov Vsevolod Georgievich (1966—1983)
 Sviridov Valentin Viktorovich (1984—1994)
 Bondarenko Mikhail Fedorovich (1994—2013)
 t.v.o. Rubin Eduard Yukhimovich (2015 — 2016)
 Semenets Valerii Vasyliovych (2017 – 2022)
 Acting Rector Igor Ruban (since 21 June 2022)

International partners

International partners
 Hochschule Düsseldorf, University of Applied Sciences, Germany 
 University of Jyväskylä (JyU), Finland
 Linnaeus University, Sweden

Notes

External links
 Official site 
 Library 
 Timetable 
 Distance Learning 

Universities and colleges in Kharkiv
Buildings and structures in Kharkiv
1962 establishments in Ukraine
Educational institutions established in 1962
National universities in Ukraine